CS Smart Sport Bucharest was a Romanian women's football club from Bucharest that played in the First League from 2003 to 2010, when it withdrew from the championship. It reached the final of the national cup in 2005 and 2008, but lost both times to CFF Clujana.

Competition record

 Liga I 
 3rd: 2006, 2008 — 4th: 2003 — 5th: 2007, 2009, 2010
 Cupa Romaniei
 Runner-up: 2005, 2008 — Semifinals: 2007 — Quarterfinals: 2010

References

Sport in Bucharest
Association football clubs disestablished in 2010
Women's football clubs in Romania
2003 establishments in Romania
Association football clubs established in 2003
2010 disestablishments in Romania